The Trevethan was an Australian automobile built in Toowoomba, Queensland by the Thomas and Walter Trevethan carriage building company. The vehicle had chain-drive and solid rubber tyres.

References

External links
 History of Thomas & Walter Trevethan carriage building company and photographs of restored automobile

Vintage vehicles
Cars of Australia